A Slave of Fashion  is a 1925 American silent romantic comedy film directed by Hobart Henley. The film stars Norma Shearer and Lew Cody, with William Haines. A young Joan Crawford had an early uncredited role as a mannequin.

Plot
As described in a film magazine reviews, Katherine Emerson, a young county woman, is on a train to New York City when it is wrecked. She comes into possession of a purse of a victim, the mistress of a wealthy bachelor. She replaces the dead woman in the home of the bachelor, who is in Europe. An unexpected visit from her family forces her to pretend to be the wife of the wealthy bachelor. The mother cables the bachelor as a result of a growing friendship with a refined young society man. He returns unexpectedly and insists that she continue to play the game. Katherine threatens to tell her folks of her folly, but the bachelor sets things aright by taking her to the minister.

Cast

Preservation
With no copies listed in any film archives, A Slave of Fashion is considered lost.

References

External links

 
 
 Norma Shearer and Mary Carr in a scene from the film
 Stills at normashearer.com

1925 films
1925 romantic comedy films
American romantic comedy films
American silent feature films
American black-and-white films
Films directed by Hobart Henley
Films set in New York City
Lost American films
Metro-Goldwyn-Mayer films
Films with screenplays by Bess Meredyth
Films with screenplays by Jane Murfin
1925 lost films
Lost romantic comedy films
1920s American films
Silent romantic comedy films
Silent American comedy films